is a passenger railway station in the town of Daigo, Kuji District, Ibaraki Prefecture, operated by East Japan Railway Company (JR East).

Lines
Hitachi-Daigo Station is served by the Suigun Line, and is located 55.6 rail kilometers from the official starting point of the line at Mito Station.

Station layout
The station consists of a single side platform and a single island platform connected to the station building by a footbridge. The station has a Midori no Madoguchi staffed ticket office. A JNR Class C12 steam locomotive is on static display in front of the station.

Platforms

History
Hitachi-Daigo Station opened on March 10, 1927. The station was absorbed into the JR East network upon the privatization of the Japanese National Railways (JNR) on April 1, 1987.

Passenger statistics
In fiscal 2019, the station was used by an average of 255 passengers daily (boarding passengers only).

Surrounding area

Daigo Town Hall
Daigo Post Office
 Daigo Onsen

See also
List of railway stations in Japan

References

External links

 JR East Station information 

Railway stations in Ibaraki Prefecture
Suigun Line
Railway stations in Japan opened in 1927
Daigo, Ibaraki